The Olympic Velodrome was a sports venue located in Rome, Italy. Constructed for the 1960 Summer Olympics, it hosted the track cycling and field hockey events.

The velodrome was constructed between 1957 and early 1960. Soon after it was built problems were found, as water was draining away the foundations on one side of the velodrome. Concrete was injected into the foundations, which solved the problem only temporarily. It was last used for competition in 1968, when it hosted the UCI Track Cycling World Championships. After this it was abandoned, until it was imploded on 24 July 2008.

References
 1960 Summer Olympics official report. Volume 1. pp. 72, 74–5.

Venues of the 1960 Summer Olympics
Defunct sports venues in Italy
Olympic cycling venues
Olympic field hockey venues
Velodromes in Italy
Cycle racing in Italy
Rome Q. XXXII Europa
1960 establishments in Italy
1968 disestablishments in Italy
Sports venues completed in 1960
Sports venues demolished in 2008